The 1997–98 season was Stoke City's 91st season in the Football League and the 35th in the second tier. It was also Stoke's first season at the Britannia Stadium.

With Stoke now at a new home after 119 years at the Victoria Ground the hope was it would be the start of a new era for the club. Following Lou Macari's departure, his assistant Chic Bates was appointed as manager but the first league match in the Britannia Stadium was lost 2–1 against Swindon Town. Results were generally quite good and by the end of October Stoke were in a play-off position. However performances completely dropped off and the club dropped down the table like a stone and on 10 January 1998 Birmingham City beat Stoke 7–0 at home which sparked ugly scenes from some angry supporters. Bates and Peter Coates left as Stoke headed for relegation. Chris Kamara came in but was sacked after winning just one of his 14 matches in charge. Former manager Alan Durban returned for the final few matches which saw Stoke needing to beat Manchester City on the final day to stay up. They lost 5–2 and fell into the third tier.

Season review

League
The dawn of a new era at the Britannia Stadium should have been full of hope, but the departure of Lou Macari still not fully explained plus the farcical search for a replacement, left fans wondering what exactly was going on. Many felt the delay in announcing the new manager was a way of boosting season ticket sales with many expecting Sammy McIlroy to be named as the new boss but the silence was deafening and caretaker Chic Bates was left to take care of pre-season training. It soon became clear that Bates was going to be give the role full-time and in July he duly was much to the disappointment of many. Former manager Alan Durban made a return to the club as Bates' assistant to help take away some of his responsibilities. If Stoke had bid farewell to the Victoria Ground in a blaze of glory then the fiasco in opening the Britannia Stadium was a pit of despair. There was transport problems, ticket problems and the opening ceremony against Swindon Town was awful.

The only major signing was that of striker Peter Thorne for £550,000 whilst a small spattering of players arrived from Europe following Jean-Marc Bosman's court victory for footballers contracts. Chairman Peter Coates was now very unpopular with the supporters and there were many protests against him due to Coates not spending his money. Attendances at the new ground were poor and by Christmas Stoke had lost their early season form and were in serious trouble. The slump was brought to head early in the new year when Birmingham City beat Stoke 7–0 at home which prompted ugly scenes at the final whistle as around 2,000 fans invaded the pitch and attempted to enter the directors box. The next match live on TV against Bradford City saw more fan protests and Coates resigned as chairman.

On the pitch Bates was clearly not cut to be a manager and so was replaced by former Bradford boss Chris Kamara. He arrived with bold intentions claiming that he would build a squad good enough to take Stoke into the Premiership, But he sold the only real player of value, Andy Griffin and in his 14 matches in charge only one was won and after an awful 3–0 defeat against Tranmere Rovers he lost his job. Kamara's time at Stoke was a disaster and with Stoke heading for relegation Alan Durban took over for the remaining matches. Three wins in four home matches gave Stoke some hope, but a 5–2 defeat against Manchester City on the final day saw the inevitable happen (albeit results elsewhere meant both teams would have been relegated irrespective of the result) and Stoke were relegated as were Man City despite their big win.

FA Cup
Stoke lost to West Bromwich Albion 3–1 in the third round.

League Cup
Stoke beat Rochdale and Burnley before being knocked out by Leeds United.

Final league table

Results
Stoke's score comes first

Legend

Football League First Division

FA Cup

League Cup

Squad statistics

References

Stoke City F.C. seasons
Stoke City